Love Life is the second studio album by  American singer/songwriter Brenda Russell, released in March 1981 by A&M Records.

Critical reception

People described the LP as "eight of her pleasantly upbeat songs delivered with sassy-to-soothing vocals". Phyl Garland of Stereo Review called the album "fresh, accessible and delightful".

Track listing

Personnel 
 Brenda Russell – lead vocals, backing vocals (2-8), acoustic piano (2-7), handclaps (4), clavinet (6)
 Neil Larsen – Fender Rhodes, acoustic piano (1), organ (4, 5), handclaps (4), Wurlitzer electric piano (6), backing vocals (8)
 Steve Porcaro – synthesizers (1-5)
 Don Grusin – synthesizers (8)
 Steve Lukather – guitar solo (1, 5), electric guitar (2, 6, 7), guitar (4, 5, 8), handclaps (4), first guitar solo (8)
 Dean Parks – guitar (1, 3, 4, 5), electric guitar (2, 7), acoustic guitar solo (2), acoustic guitar (7)
 Buzz Feiten – guitar (8), second guitar solo (8), backing vocals (8)
 Abraham Laboriel – bass (1-4, 6, 7, 8), handclaps (4)
 Robert Popwell – bass (5)
 Jeff Porcaro – drums, handclaps (4)
 Lenny Castro – percussion (1, 3-8), handclaps (4), backing vocals (8)
 Bill Champlin – backing vocals (1, 8)
 Donny Gerrard – backing vocals (1, 5, 6, 8), lead vocals (7)
 Jay Gruska – backing vocals (1)
 David Lasley – backing vocals (1)
 Arnold McCuller – backing vocals (1, 6, 8)
 Cinnamon Sharpe – backing vocals (1)
 Stewart Levine – backing vocals (8)

Production 
 Stewart Levine – producer 
 Brenda Russell – executive producer 
 Al Schmitt – engineer, mixing 
 Don Henderson – assistant engineer
 Stewart Whitmore – assistant engineer
 Bernie Grundman – mastering 
 Chuck Beeson – art direction 
 Lynn Robb – design
 Paddy Reynolds – photography

Studios
 Recorded at Sound Labs (Hollywood, California).
 Synthesizers recorded at Chateau Recorders (North Hollywood, California).
 Mixed at Capitol Studios (Hollywood, California).
 Mastered at A&M Studios (Hollywood, California).

Charts

References

1981 albums
A&M Records albums
albums produced by Stewart Levine
Brenda Russell albums